Cruz Carbajal (born 3 May 1974) is a Mexican former professional boxer who competed from 1992 to 2012. He is the younger brother of Hall of Fame boxer Michael Carbajal.

Professional career
After making his debut in 1992, Carbajal won 14 of his first 17 fights. He suffered six consecutive losses mid-way through his career, including decisions to future world champions Johnny Bredahl, Lehlohonolo Ledwaba and Néstor Garza, and knockout losses to Samson Dutch Boy Gym and Julio Ceja.

WBO bantamweight title
Carbajal captured the WBO bantamweight title from Mauricio Martinez in March 2002. He made two successful defences of the title, against Danny Romero and Gerardo Espinoza, before losing it to Ratanachai Sor Vorapin.

See also
List of bantamweight boxing champions
List of Mexican boxing world champions

References

External links

1974 births
Living people
Super-flyweight boxers
Bantamweight boxers
Super-bantamweight boxers
World bantamweight boxing champions
World Boxing Organization champions
Mexican male boxers
Boxers from Veracruz
People from Veracruz (city)